Manolov (masculine) or Manolova (feminine) is a Bulgarian surname. Notable people with the surname include:

Alek Manolov (born 1986), Bulgarian footballer
Aleksandar Manolov (born 1990), Bulgarian footballer
Angel Manolov (born 1981), Bulgarian footballer
Anton Manolov (born 1937), Bulgarian sport shooter
Dimiter Manolov (1940–1998), Bulgarian conductor
Emanuil Manolov (1860–1902), Bulgarian composer
Kiril Manolov (born 1976), Bulgarian opera singer
Manol Manolov (1925–2008), Bulgarian footballer and manager
Maya Manolova (born 1965), Bulgarian politician
Miroslav Manolov (born 1985), Bulgarian footballer

Bulgarian-language surnames